Colchester Institute is a large provider of further and higher education based in the city of Colchester. Colchester Institute provides full-time and part-time courses for a wide variety of learners including 16 to 19 year olds, apprentices, adults, businesses and employers. Undergraduate and Postgraduate Higher Education courses are delivered through University Centre Colchester and validated by the University of East Anglia, University of Huddersfield and University of Essex.

History

Colchester Institute has its roots in the North East Essex Technical College. It widened to include degree level programmes in Music (through accreditation by the University of London), Hospitality & Catering and Art. In 1992 it joined with a number of colleges and "Anglia Higher Education College" to enable the latter to acquire university status as Anglia Polytechnic University (now Anglia Ruskin University). The other colleges in the Higher Education aspects of the "consortium" included City College Norwich, and the Norwich School of Art and Design. 
The "consortium" was dissolved in 2006 under a ratification programme proposed by the Higher Education Funding Council (England), and from that time Colchester Institute Higher Education awards were accredited by the University of Essex.

The institute's buildings were completely refurbished in 2000 with internal demolition, structural repairs and reconfiguration of the existing 1950s buildings, providing 4,000m2 of new internal floor space for workshops, laboratories, classrooms and a library in which to study. In 2003, a new Construction Craft Centre opened, to provide specialist facilities for Plumbing and Electrical Installations.

On 1 January 2010, Colchester Institute took over Braintree College rebranding this as The College At Braintree and subsequently Braintree Campus.

The £10m STEM (Science, Technology, Engineering and Maths) Centre and South Wing building opened in 2016 at the Sheepen Road Campus. The advanced equipment and facilities incorporates a HAAS CNC machining centre, simulation rigs, commercial 3D printers, auto-CAD, and specialist science equipment.

Another flagship facility at the Colchester site is the £5m Centre for Health and Social Care Professions. Launched in 2020 with the addition of another storey to the South Wing building, this new floor incorporates cutting edge immersive technology for creating simulated learning environments.

Facilities opened in 2022 include the Early Years Centre and commercial hair and beauty salons.

Campus information 

Colchester, Sheepen Road Campus

The Colchester Campus is situated just outside Colchester's old Roman walls; the city centre and the railway station are within walking distance.

University Centre Colchester, Sheepen Road Campus

Located on Colchester Institute's Sheepen Road Campus, University Centre Colchester offers a wide-range of full-time and part-time honours degrees, together with HNC/Ds, Higher apprenticeships and postgraduate qualifications.

Braintree Campus, Church Lane, Braintree

Colchester Institute's newest campus (following the merger with Braintree College) offers students a range of vocational qualifications to meet the needs of employers in the Braintree and surrounding areas.

The Energy Skills Centre, Harwich

Supported by the Skills Funding Agency, Essex County Council and Tendring District Council the Centre first opened in 2013 following a £500,000 investment underlining the College's commitment to supporting skills requirements within the energy sector.

Adult Skills Centre at Colchester

Located on the Colchester Institute Sheepen Road Campus, this centre offers courses specialising in English, IT and maths. The Adult Skills Centre is an information point to members of the public seeking general information and advice on courses, careers and other academic issues.

Adult Skills Centres at Braintree, Clacton, Dovercourt and Witham

The online courses offered in maths, English and IT are designed to meet the needs of the individual. Members of the public can also receive general information and advice on careers, courses and other academic issues.

Departments 
Colchester Institute has many faculties covering a variety of subject areas including:

 Business, Accounting and Administration
 Computing and IT
 Construction
 Education Studies and Teacher Training
 Engineering and Automotive industries including Welding and Fabrication
 Fine Art, Design, Fashion, Photography and Graphics
 Hairdressing and Beauty Therapy
 Healthcare including Counselling, Dental Nursing, Science and Forensic Investigation.
 Hospitality and Food Studies
 Interactive Media, Games Design and Digital Film Production
 Management
 Music and Performing Arts
 Sport and Public Services

Colchester Institute has around 8,000 students and runs approximately 120 full-time courses.

Alumni 
John Dagleish - actor 
 Patricia Allison - actress 
 Roger Eno - Musician
 Jon Hare - Games Designer & Musician
 Bob Russell - Former MP for Colchester
 Jordan Cardy - Musician
 Adam Mansfield - Cricketer
 Colin Baldy - Musician, Opera Singer, Choral Director
 Sade - Singer
 Sam Ryder - Musician

See also 
 Braintree College
 Centre for Music and Performing Arts

References

External links 
 Colchester Institute

Education in Colchester
Further education colleges in Essex
Buildings and structures in Colchester (town)